Li Jiao may refer to:

Li Jiao (Tang Dynasty), official of the Chinese Tang Dynasty
Li Jiao (table tennis) (born 1973), Chinese-born table tennis player